= Albert Mbida =

Cameroonian politician and academic

Personal details
- Occupation: Senator, university lecturer

Albert Mbida is a Cameroonian senator and university lecturer.

== Biography ==
=== Career ===
Mbida is a civil servant and has worked as a sports editor at Radio Cameroon, alongside Zacharie Nkwo and Abel Mbengué.

=== Publications ===
He is the author of several works:

- Le Directeur De Publication Dans Le Droit Positif De La Communication Au Cameroun
- La diffamation en droit camerounais de la communication
